Christine Hutchinson is an Australian children's entertainer and magician. Her album Grand Fairies Ball was nominated for the ARIA Award for Best Children's Album in 1996 but lost to The Wiggles' Wake Up Jeff!, along with the accompanying song being nominated for the APRA Award for Most Performed Children's Work in the same year, but also lost to The Wiggles' accompanying song.

Biography
Christine is also a respected magician and performer and toured widely during the 1980s and 1990s both throughout Australia as well as overseas. Her touring shows included "Wait a Minim...There's Something Up My Sleeve", "Out of the Hat" and "Grand Fairies Ball" (all directed by Gilli Farrelly  Gilly McInnes). Christine performed an estimated 8000 shows during these touring years.

From 1993, Christine was a part of the ABC for Kids stable of performers and wrote her two solo albums for ABC/EMI. Out Of The Hat (1993) was produced by Ian Blake, with songs by herself, Blake and Mike Jackson. Grand Fairies Ball (1996) was produced by Justin McCoy. Christine wrote a third solo album, Magical Menagerie (2009), which she produced with Julian Gough and self-distributed on SoundCloud.

During the 1990s, she co-wrote and performed on many albums with various friends on various labels, including Festival, BMG and PolyGram. She also ran a booking agency for acts Australia-wide. Some of her artists included friends Monica Trapaga, Jan Wositzky (The Bushwackers) and Hot Dog (members of rock band, The Angels).

In 2000, Christine started a law degree at La Trobe University in Melbourne. She practised at law firms Deacons and Norton Rose Australia. Between 2010 and 2014 she worked as a judge's associate at the County Court in Melbourne for Judge Jane Patrick. In 2014, Christine took a job as a teacher of legal studies and musical performance at Aitken College in Melbourne's North where she taught until the end of 2018. She is now semi-retired and teaches piano and music theory from her home studio in Melbourne and conducts community choirs in Melbourne's inner North.

Personal life
In the mid-1990s, she and her husband, Peter had two sons, Rory and Noah. She toured (with the children) extensively during the 1990s on promotional theatrical tours with shows of the same name. Christine toured in an old ambulance called "Arthur" and mostly drove across Australia by herself or with the children and their Nanna. When her children were of school age, Christine stopped touring and managed/booked artists from her Melbourne-based agency, Hat Trick Productions.

Discography

Solo albums
Out of the Hat (1993) ABC Music/EMI (produced by Ian Blake)
Grand Fairies Ball (1996) ABC Music/EMI (produced by Justin McCoy)
Magical Menagerie (2009) SoundCloud (produced by Julian Gough)

With other artists
Snugglepot and Cuddlepie (their first adventure) (1994) ABC Music (co-performer Justin McCoy)
Snugglepot and Cuddlepie (their second adventure) (1994) ABC Music (co-performer Justin McCoy)
A Book For Kids Vol 1. (Clarence James Dennis) (1994) ABC Music (co-performers Ian Blake, Pat Drummond and Mike Jackson)
A Book For Kids Vol 2. (Clarence James Dennis) (1994) ABC Music (co-performers Ian Blake, Pat Drummond and Mike Jackson)
A Book For Kids Vol 3. (Clarence James Dennis) (1994) ABC Music (co-performers Ian Blake, Pat Drummond and Mike Jackson)
Elves and Fairies of the Australian Bush (1995) Larrikin (co-performers Ian Blake and George Spartels)
Snugglepot and Cuddlepie (their third adventure) (1995) Karussell/PolyGram (co-performer Justin McCoy)
Snugglepot and Cuddlepie (their fourth adventure) (1995) Karussell/PolyGram (co-performer Justin McCoy)
Snugglepot and Cuddlepie (their fifth adventure) (1996) Karussell/PolyGram (co-performer Justin McCoy)
Snugglepot and Cuddlepie (their sixth adventure) (1996) Karussell/PolyGram (co-performer Justin McCoy)
The Magic Pudding (the first slice) (1996) Karussell/PolyGram, Larrikin (co-performers Ian Blake and George Spartels)
The Magic Pudding (the second slice) (1996) Karussell/PolyGram, Larrikin (co-performers Ian Blake and George Spartels)
The Magic Pudding (the third slice) (1996) Karussell/PolyGram, Larrikin (co-performers Ian Blake and George Spartels)
The Magic Pudding (the fourth slice) (1996) Karussell/PolyGram, Larrikin (co-performers Ian Blake and George Spartels)

Videography
Monica's House (1996) Network Entertainment (played the character of Mrs George Davino)
Grand Fairies Ball (1996) ABC Music Promotional Clip (Directed by Ignatius Jones, Cinematography by David Collins. Featuring Monica Trapaga, Mic Conway, George Washingmachine and Julian Gough)

Books
Out of the Hat: songs, poems, activities, recipes, music and magic  (1995) ABC Enterprises (illustrated by Bronwyn Halls)

Awards and nominations

APRA Music Awards

ARIA Music Awards

References

Australian children's musicians
Living people
Year of birth missing (living people)